Phob may refer to:
Phobia 
Phenobarbital, by the trade name Phob